The 1967 Fairmont State Falcons football team was an American football team that represented Fairmont State University as a member of the West Virginia Intercollegiate Athletic Conference (WVIAC) during the 1967 NAIA football season. In their 16th season under head coach Harold "Deacon" Duvall, the Falcons compiled a perfect 11–0 record (7–0 against conference opponents) and won the WVIAC championship. The team advanced to the NAIA playoffs where they defeated  in the semifinals and then beat  in the Champion Bowl to win the 1967 NAIA national championship. The team led the NAIA in defense, allowing only 119.8 yards per game (60.5 passing and 59.3 rushing).

The Falcons' 1967 NAIA national championship was the State of West Virginia's first national title in football.  The 1967 Fairmont team was inducted into the Fairmont State Athletics Hall of Fame in 2017.

The team played its home games at East-West Stadium in Fairmont, West Virginia.

Schedule

Game summaries

Waynesburg

On November 4, the Falcons defeated defending NAIA national champion . Waynesburg was ranked No. 1 in the NAIA, had averaged 63 points and 488 yards per game to that point in the season, and was on an 18-game winning streak. Fairmont was ranked No. 8 prior to the game. The game, played at Fairfield, was attended by an estimated 10,000 fans, the largest crowd in Fairmont history.  The game remained scoreless until the final minute of the games. Fairmont's defense held Waynesburg to 68 yards of total offense and did not give up a first down in the second half. In the final 40 seconds, Fairmont quarterback Roy Michael threw a 16-yard touchdown pass to wingback Ron Robison.

NAIA semifinals: Northern Michigan

 
   
 

On November 25, Fairmont defeated previously unbeaten , 21–7, in the NAIA eastern semifinal game. The game was played on a muddy field in Fairmont. Fairmont scored in the first quarter on a 19-yard touchdown pass from John Kara to George Edwards, then increased its lead in the second quarter on a three-yard touchdown run by Ron Robison.

The Fairmont defense held Northern Michigan to 33 yards on the ground and intercepted three Northern Michigan passes. Lloyd Carr, later inducted as a coach into the College Football Hall of Fame, was the quarterback for Northern Michigan. With 43 second remaining in the first half, Carr threw a 24-yard touchdown pass to Ron Stump.

Northern Michigan returned the opening kickoff of the second half for 60 yards. The Wildcats drove deep into Fairmont territory for a potential tying score, but fullback Lonnie Holton fumbled a pitchout at the four-yard line, and Fairmont defensive back Sonny Bartic recovered the loose ball. Northern Michigan coach Rollie Dotsch said afterward that the fumble "ruined our momentum" and was "one of the key turning points."

Fairmont scored its final touchdown late in the third quarter on a 14-yard touchdown pass from Roy Michael to tight end David Coe.

Champion Bowl: Eastern Washington

 
   
  
   
  
  

On December 9, the Falcons defeated  in the Champion Bowl to win the NAIA national championship.  The game was played at Mountaineer Field in Morgantown, West Virginia.

Eastern Washington took a 14–0 lead on a pair of touchdown passes by quarterback Bill Diedrick. Fairmont capitalized on mistakes to come from behind in the third quarter. On the opening kickoff of the second half, Rick Hardie fumbled at the 20-yard line, and George Edwards recovered the fumble for Fairmont. Three plays later, Roy Michael threw an 18-yard touchdown pass to Jim Mertens.  Three minutes, later Eastern Washington turned the ball over again as the center snapped the ball over the head of the punter.  Fairmont took over at the one-yard line and promptly took the lead on a one-yard run by Larry Blackstone.

Awards and honors
Coach Duvall was unanimously selected by the WVIAC coaches as the "Football Coach of the Year". 

Senior Larry Blackstone played offensive fullback and defensive end and led the team with 1,292 rushing yards. He was selected as the "Back of the Year" by the conference coaches and was also named as a first-team defensive end on the NAIA All-America teams selected by the NAIA and the UPI. His twin brother Barry Blackstone was a starter at the other defensive end position for Fairmont.

Roster

Offense
 Larry Blackstone, fullback, No. 33
 David Coe, tight end, No. 84
 George Edwards, tailback, No. 43
 Roger Hill, tackle, No. 71
 John Huff, guard and place-kicker, No. 67
 John Kara, quarterback, No. 10
 Rick Merrill, center, No. 51
 Jim Mertens, split end, No. 82
 Roy Michael, quarterback, No. 13
 Jack Reagan, guard, No. 61
 Jim Reynolds, guard, No. 70
 Ron Robison, wingback, No. 20
 George Shreyer, tackle, No. 72

Defense
 Martin Bartic, linebacker, No. 42
 Barry Blackstone, defensive end, No. 41
 Larry Blackstone, defensive end, No. 33
 Roy Dowell, defensive tackle, No. 79
 Bill Ewusiak, safety, No. 21
 Matt Fortier, defensive tackle, No. 75
 Mike Marra, cornerback, No. 30
 Jim Mertins, defensive halfback, No. 82
 Ron Robison, safety, No. 20
 George Shreyer, defensive tackle, No. 72
 Tom Swisher, linebacker, No. 63
 Mark Tennant, cornerback, No. 85
 Dave Williams, middle guard, No. 74
 Marvin Williams, middle guard, No. 86

Coaching staff
 Head coach: Harold "Deacon" Duvall
 Athletic director: Wilford Wilson
 Defensive line coach: Joe Bundy
 Offensive line coach: William Kerr
 Freshman coach: Larry Hill

References

Fairmont State
Fairmont State Fighting Falcons football seasons
NAIA Football National Champions
Fairmont State Falcons football
College football undefeated seasons